Robert Trewhella (1830 – 6 February 1909) was a railway engineer from Cornwall, England.    Фугикл

Origins
Robert Trewhella II was born in Cornwall, in the parish of Ludgvan (3 miles north-east of Penzance) and was christened there on 30 May 1830. He was a son of Robert Trewheela I (1792/6-1846) of Cockwells in the parish of Ludgvan, a miner and farmer, by his first wife Mary Repper (d.1831), whom he married in 1815 at Ludgvan.

Little is recorded regarding the history of the Trewhella family. The historic estate of "Trewhella" (today "Trewhella Farm") is situated in the parish of St Hilary, 3 miles east of Ludgvan, in an area containing many former mines, most notably Wheal Fortune. A certain James Trewhella, in 1633 a churchwarden of Towednack, the parish on the east side of Ludgvan, is represented as one of two profile busts sculpted on surviving wooden bench ends in that church. It has been proposed that his son was Matthew Trewhella, a choirboy with a beautiful voice who in the legend of the Mermaid of Zennor, (recorded in 1873 by William Bottrell (1816-1881) in his Traditions and Hearthside Stories of West Cornwall) was abducted from the parish of Zennor (adjacent to both Ludgvan and Towednack) into the sea by a mermaid, which legendary creature is sculpted on the surviving Mermaid Chair in  St Senara's Church, Zennor, constructed from two 15th century bench ends.

Career
He studied civil engineering and worked with the famous engineer Isambard Kingdom Brunel. Between 1850 and 1860, Trewhella was invited by the Italian government to participate in the construction of the infrastructure of the country. He moved to Italy, designing and building railways, roads and bridges, including the seventy-mile line between Florence and Bologna through the rugged Apennine Mountains. He built various narrow-gauge railways in Sicily, including the Circumetnea line around Mount Etna, and the Palermo–Corleone line. He acquired land and sulphur mines, and built the first great hotel in Palermo, the Excelsior, where, in 1903 he received King Edward VII and Queen Alexandra as his guests. He is associated in some manner with the Palazzo Trewhella, 91-103 Via Garibaldi, on the south side of that street, west of the junction with Via Santa Chiara, Catania, a large 18th century apartment block surrounding a central courtyard.

Builds Villa Sant'Andrea
He built the Villa Sant'Andrea on the beach in the Bay of Mazzarò below Taormina, Sicily, as his summer house.  In 1919 the villa was completed by his son Percy Trewhella, whose daughter Gwendoline Trewhella (born in nearby Catania) and her husband Major Ivor Manley transformed it in 1950 into the present well-known hotel. Ivor Manley was attached as an intelligence corps officer to the US 5th Army during the 1943 Allied invasion which recaptured Sicily and Italy from German occupation, and he personally recovered possession of Villa Sant'Andrea which had been used as an officer's mess for the staff of Field Marshal Albert Kesselring whose HQ was at the Hotel San Domenico in Taormina.

Marriage and issue
On 2 January 1862 at Leghorn in Italy, he married Kate Lucy Thrupp, an Englishwoman whom he met in Sicily. His brother John Trewhella (1816-1878) "of Penzance", Cornwall, also a railway engineer, married her sister Anna Maria Thrupp and died at Sorrento, Italy. By his wife he had issue including:
Charles Robert Trewhella (1865-1893), born in Florence 14 March 1865, educated at Clifton College in Gloucestershire, a member of the Institute of Civil Engineers, who died at Rome on 8 March 1893, aged 28, where he was buried in the Protestant Cemetery. His obituary published by the  Institution of Civil Engineers states as follows:

(Alfred) Percy Trewhella (24 April 1875 - 5 April 1959), born 24 April 1875 in Castellamare di Stabia, Naples, Italy, married Gertrude Deidamia Sarauw (11 July 1880 - 5 April 1959), born in Messina, Sicily, the daughter of Carl Christian 'Carlo' Sarauw. The journal of Mrs Gertrude Trewhella's internment in occupied France during WW II was published in 2014, edited by her grandson's wife Jane Manley. The couple died together in tragic circumstances at Taormina when Gertrude "stepped out of the way of a car in the villa grounds and fell, as she did so, her husband Alfred tried to catch hold of her and, tragically, the two of them fell to their deaths". By his wife he had a son and two daughters:
Gerald Trewhella (1908-28 December 1908), born in Catania, died in infancy during the 1908 Messina earthquake, the most destructive earthquake ever experienced in Europe which killed 100,000 people.
Gwendoline Deidamia Trewhella (1910-1998), born in Catania, who in 1936 at Taormina married Major (William Arthur Reginald) Ivor Manley (1912-1973) of Bacton Grange, Abbey Dore, in Herefordshire, of the Welsh Guards and later of the British Intelligence Corps, in 1946 British Vice-Consul at Naples; Her son Richard ("Dickie") Ivor Trewhella Manley (born 1939) inherited the hotel in 1965, which he managed together with his wife (Priscilla) Jane Allin (a great-grand-daughter of Colonel Robert Bridges Bellers, JP, DL, of Bacton Grange) until 1985 when the family, with four children, returned permanently to England.
(Vittoria) Vivien Trewhella (1914-1991), born in Catania on 9 March 1914, wife of Sir John Norris Nicholson, 2nd Baronet of Brooke House, Parkgate, Cheshire and of Mottistone Manor, Isle of Wight, Lord Lieutenant of the Isle of Wight 1980-6, Chairman of the Ocean Steam Ship Company 1957-71, Chairman of Martins Bank 1962-4 and a director of Barclays Bank 1969-81.
Beatrice Elford, daughter, mentioned in her father's will, dated 11 July 1908 at Palermo
Adele Carnazzo, daughter, mentioned in her father's will.

Death and burial
He died at 19 Viale Margherita, his mansion in Catania, Sicily, on 6 February 1909 and was buried in the Protestant Cemetery, Rome.

References

Further reading
Kalla-Bishop, P.M., Mediterranean Island Railways (part of series Railway Histories of the World), Newton Abbot, 1970
 

1830 births
19th-century British engineers
19th-century English people
English expatriates in Taormina, Sicily
Engineers from Cornwall
British emigrants
People of Cornish descent
English civil engineers
People from Ludgvan, Cornwall